Christoph Schmölzer (born 30 November 1962) is an Austrian lightweight rower. He won a gold medal at the 1989 World Rowing Championships in Bled with the lightweight men's double scull.

References

1962 births
Living people
Austrian male rowers
World Rowing Championships medalists for Austria
Olympic rowers of Austria
Rowers at the 1996 Summer Olympics